Eugenia Perpetua Butler (1947–2008) was an American conceptual artist. In 1993 she hosted a series of televised conversations called "The Kitchen Table" at the Art/LA93 art fair. She is best known for the "Book of Lies" project, started in 1991 and celebrated with a traveling exhibition that was installed at the 18th Street Arts Center Gallery in Santa Monica in 2007.

Butler was born in Washington, D.C., the daughter of art collector Eugenia Butler and attorney James G. Butler. She studied art at the University of California, Berkeley, and after graduation traveled with her infant daughter to South America,  where she spent seven years traveling and studying shamanism.

Butler was a long time resident of Los Angeles. She died on March 29, 2008, from a brain hemorrhage in Santa Rosa, California.

Her daughter, Corazon del Sol, is also an artist, and has incorporated her mother's and grandmother's works in exhibitions.

Notes

External links
 

American conceptual artists
Women conceptual artists
Artists from Los Angeles
1947 births
2008 deaths
Artists from Washington, D.C.
20th-century American women artists
21st-century American women